Delano Gouda (born  24 January 2002) is a Dutch professional footballer who plays as a striker for Eredivisie club Sparta Rotterdam.

Career
Gouda made his professional debut appearing as a substitute away as Excelsior Rotterdam beat TOP Oss 3-1 at their Frans Heesen Stadion on 23 January, 2021. He signed for city neighbours Sparta Rotterdam on 31 May, 2022.

References

External links
 

Living people
2002 births
Dutch footballers
Excelsior Rotterdam players
Eerste Divisie players
Footballers from The Hague
Sparta Rotterdam players
Association football forwards